Thomas "Tom" Rickman (February 8, 1940 – September 3, 2018) was an American film director, playwright, and screenwriter best known for his work on Coal Miner's Daughter, Hooper, Tuesdays with Morrie and Truman.  Well known for other major movies such as Everybody's All-American (1988) as per IMDb.

In 1975, his stage play Balaam premiered at the Pasadena Repertory Theatre in Pasadena, California's historic The Hotel Carver, under artistic director Duane Waddell, directed by Gill Dennis, starring Academy Award nominated Elizabeth Hartman, Peter Brandon, Howard Whalen, and was the theatrical debut of Ed Harris.

He was in the first class at the AFI Conservatory which also included Gill Dennis, Terrence Malick, David Lynch and Caleb Deschanel.

He was born in Sharpe, Kentucky.

References

External links

American male screenwriters
American television writers
AFI Conservatory alumni
1940 births
2018 deaths
People from Marshall County, Kentucky
American male television writers
Film directors from Kentucky
Screenwriters from Kentucky